Osiny  is a village in the administrative district of Gmina Żyrzyn, within Puławy County, Lublin Voivodeship, in eastern Poland.

The village has an approximate population of 1,040.

References

Villages in Puławy County